Stephen Thomas Buchanan (March 4, 1903 – November 21, 1992) was an American football player. 

A Kentucky native, he attended Steel High School in Ohio where he starred in football, basketball, and baseball. He played college football at Miami University and professional football in the National Football League (NFL) as a back for the Dayton Triangles. He appeared in nine NFL games during the 1929 season. He died in 1992 at age 89.

References

1903 births
1992 deaths
Miami RedHawks football players
Dayton Triangles players
Players of American football from Kentucky